The National Equestrian Center, known as the Olympic Equestrian Centre during the 2016 Summer Olympics, is an equestrian venue located at the Deodoro Olympic Park in Rio de Janeiro, Brazil. The venue hosted the equestrian events for the 2016 Summer Olympics, and the equestrian events for the 2016 Summer Paralympics.

Footnotes

References
Rio2016.org.br bid package. Volume 2. p. 18.

Sports venues in Rio de Janeiro (city)
Venues of the 2016 Summer Olympics
Olympic equestrian venues
Deodoro Olympic Park